Dave Adolph (June 6, 1937 – February 12, 2017) was an American football coach. He served as defensive coordinator for the Cleveland Browns from 1986 to 1988. Prior to leaving the Browns in 1985 for the San Diego Chargers, he was the Browns' interim defensive coordinator in 1984. The promotion occurred after Marty Schottenheimer was elevated from the team's defensive coordinator position to head coach midway through the season. He joined Schottenheimer as his defensive coordinator for the Kansas City Chiefs from 1992 to 1994. Adolph was the defensive coordinator in four AFC championship games for three different NFL teams.

Coaching career
Adolph, one of few football staff members to serve both the Michigan and Ohio State programs, was selected to serve as honorary captain for both teams on the same day for the Michigan–Ohio State football game in Columbus, Ohio on November 26, 2016.

NFL All-Pro players coached by Dave Adolph include: Lyle Alzado, Clay Matthews Jr., Chip Banks, Tom Cousineau, Howie Long, Bob Golic, Hanford Dixon, Frank Minnifield, Scott Studwell, Derrick Thomas, and Junior Seau.

References

1937 births
2017 deaths
American football linebackers
Akron Zips baseball coaches
Akron Zips football players
Akron Zips football coaches
Cleveland Browns coaches
UConn Huskies football coaches
Illinois Fighting Illini football coaches
Kansas City Chiefs coaches
Kentucky Wildcats football coaches
Los Angeles Raiders coaches
Oakland Raiders coaches
Ohio State Buckeyes football coaches
San Diego Chargers coaches
San Diego Toreros football coaches
National Football League defensive coordinators
Sportspeople from Akron, Ohio
Players of American football from Ohio